Nimble Dragon may refer to:

 An aircraft, NWPU_V/STOL_UAV#Nimble_Dragon
 A nuclear reactor, Small_modular_reactor#China